Liolaemus villaricensis, the Villarica tree iguana, is a species of lizard in the family Iguanidae or the family Liolaemidae. The species is endemic to Chile.

References

villaricensis
Lizards of South America
Reptiles of Chile
Endemic fauna of Chile
Reptiles described in 1932
Taxa named by Walter Hellmich